The University of Wollongong (abbreviated as UOW) is an Australian public research university located in the coastal city of Wollongong, New South Wales, approximately 80 kilometres south of Sydney. As of 2023, the university had an enrolment of more than 33,000 students (including over 12,300 international students), an alumni base of more than 176,000 [LC1] and over 2,400 staff members including 16 Distinguished professors.

In 1951, a division of the New South Wales University of Technology (known as the University of New South Wales from 1958) was established in Wollongong for the conduct of diploma courses. In 1961, the Wollongong University College of the University of New South Wales was constituted and the college was officially opened in 1962. In 1975 the University of Wollongong was established as an independent institution. Since its establishment, the university has conferred more than 120,000 degrees, diplomas and certificates. Its students, originally predominantly from the local Illawarra region, are now from over 150 countries, with international students accounting for more than 37 percent of total.

The University of Wollongong has developed into a multi-campus institution, both domestically and globally. The Wollongong campus, the university's main campus, is on the original site five kilometres north-west of the city centre, and covers an area of 82.4 hectares with 94 permanent buildings. In addition, there are regional university campuses in Bega, Batemans Bay, Moss Vale and Shoalhaven, as well as three Sydney campuses, including the UOW Sydney Business School, UOW Liverpool and UOW Sutherland. Beyond Australia, UOW has campuses in Dubai, Hong Kong and cities in Malaysia. UOW has also established partnerships with a number of international education institutions in China and Singapore, to provide students with opportunities to access quality education delivered by UOW outside Australia.

History

Over 60 years, the university has grown from a provincial feeder college with 300 students to an international university with over 33,000 students spread across nine domestic campuses and four international centres.

Establishment
The University of Wollongong traces its origins to 1951. The foundation of the university was in 1951 when a division of The New South Wales University of Technology (currently known as the University of New South Wales, UNSW) was established in Wollongong. In 1962, the division became the Wollongong College of the University of New South Wales.

On 1 January 1975, the New South Wales Parliament incorporated the University of Wollongong as an independent institution of higher learning consisting of five faculties (including engineering, humanities, mathematics, sciences and social sciences) with Michael Birt as its inaugural vice chancellor. In 1976, Justice Robert Marsden Hope was installed as chancellor of the university. As of 1982, the university amalgamated the Wollongong Institute of Higher Education which had begun life in 1962 as the Wollongong Teachers' College; thus the merger formed the basis for a period of rapid growth in the 1980s.

History
In 1951, a foundation of the University of Wollongong was founded as a division of the New South Wales University of Technology in Wollongong. A decade later, the division became the Wollongong College of the University of New South Wales.

In 1972, the library was three storeys high and could fit 280 students. In 1975, the University of Wollongong gained its autonomy as an independent institution of higher learning by the Parliament of New South Wales. In 1976, the library expanded and could fit 530 students.

In 1977, the Faculty of Computer Science (currently known as the Faculty of Engineering and Information Sciences) developed a version of Unix for the Interdata 7/32 called UNSW 01, this was the first non-PDP Unix. In the late 70s, Tim Berners-Lee sourced TCP/IP software, an integral element of the World Wide Web, from the University of Wollongong.

In 1981, Ken McKinnon was appointed Vice-Chancellor, overseeing the amalgamation of the university with the Wollongong Institute of Education (also known as WIE) in 1982. The Wollongong Institute of Education had originated in 1971 as the Teachers College (renamed the Wollongong Institute of Education in 1973) This merger formed the basis of the contemporary university. In 1983, the Faculty of Commerce was established along with the School of Creative Arts, followed by the creation of the Faculty of Education in 1984. Also in 1984 the commencement of the new Wollongong University building program began, which led to the construction and opening of the Illawarra Technology Centre (1985), Kooloobong (1985, 1986, 1990), Weerona College (1986), Administration, Union Mall (now known as UniCentre), URAC (1987), multi-storey carpark (1990) and heated swimming pool (1990).

In 1993, the University of Wollongong Dubai Campus in Dubai, the United Arab Emirates was established.

In 2000, the Shoalhaven campus was opened at Nowra on the South Coast. The Bega campus was also opened. In 2001, the Southern Highlands campus opened at Moss Vale.

In 2008, the university opened the first building at Wollongong Innovation Campus (abbreviated as iC) on a 20-hectare site at Brandon Park in Wollongong. In August, the Faculty of Science Dean, Rob Whelan, took up a new role as president of the University of Wollongong in Dubai.

In October 2009 Chancellor Mike Codd retired as chancellor after three four-year terms. He was succeeded by Jillian Broadbent.

In July 2010, the New South Wales Health Minister, Carmel Tebbutt, opened the $30 million Illawarra Health and Medical Research Institute. In August, a $20 million building housing the Sydney Business School and the UOW/TAFE Digital Media Centre opened at the Innovation Campus. The centre was named the Mike Codd Building in honour of a former chancellor. In 2014, work began on the $20 million iAccelerate building at the Innovation Campus (iC), which offers space for up to 200 budding entrepreneurs to develop their ideas.

In 2017, the University of Wollongong South Western Sydney campus opened on Moore Street in Liverpool.

In October 2020 Christine McLoughlin succeeded Jillian Broadbent as chancellor.

Overseas expansion
In 1993 the University of Wollongong in Australia opened what was to become the University of Wollongong in Dubai (UOWD) in the United Arab Emirates. Initially called the Institute of Australian Studies (IAS), this centre made UOW the first foreign university to open a campus in the UAE, and the first Australian tertiary institution represented in the Persian Gulf region, as well as one of the earliest tertiary institutions founded in the UAE. IAS initially offered English language programs, before becoming a "feeder college" by 1995, where students completed part of a degree in business or IT in Dubai before coming to Australia to complete their studies. In 1999, it was the first foreign-owned institution in the world to be issued a licence from the federal government of the United Arab Emirates, and was formally opened as University of Wollongong, Dubai Campus in October 2000. It was officially incorporated as University of Wollongong in Dubai in 2004 and at present it has over 4,000 students from almost one hundred countries.

Campuses
The University of Wollongong comprises nine campuses in Australia:

Wollongong
The Wollongong campus, as the university's main campus, is located on the New South Wales coast, 3 km from the centre of Wollongong and 80 km south of Sydney. It is served by the North Wollongong railway station which opened in 1915 on South Coast railway line.

The Wollongong campus offers a comprehensive range of undergraduate and postgraduate courses. The courses are offered across four faculties comprising the Faculty of the Arts, Social Sciences & Humanities, the Faculty of Business and Law, the Faculty of Engineering and Information Sciences and the Faculty of Science, Medicine and Health. All together, nearly 33,000 students attend classes along with around 2,400 staff on the Wollongong campus. Apart from the teaching and research buildings, the campus includes student residences, conference facilities, food halls, supermarket, cafes, restaurants, a bar, conference facilities, indoor sports centres and gymnasium, Olympic-standard swimming pool and sports fields. The Wollongong campus is also home to UOW College.

UOW Liverpool
In 2016 The University of Wollongong expanded the growing South West Sydney region, with a campus in the Liverpool CBD taking its first cohort of students in 2017. The campus is expected to expand over the next several years.

Innovation Campus
The Innovation Campus, abbreviated as iC, is located in Wollongong, New South Wales. The campus was established with seed funding from the New South Wales government and has received ongoing support from the federal and state governments as well as the Wollongong City Council and was established to drive partnerships and collaboration between the research and business communities by co-locating commercial and research organisation.

Sydney Business School

The Sydney Business School, which was established in 1997, is the graduate school of UOW's Faculty of Business and offers postgraduate business programs at the Sydney CBD Campus located at Circular Quay, and UOW's Wollongong Campus.

Regional campuses 
 Batemans Bay, New South Wales 
 Bega, New South Wales 
 Southern Sydney (Loftus), New South Wales
 Shoalhaven, New South Wales
 Southern Highlands (Moss Vale), New South Wales
 The Southern Highlands campus opened a new building designed by Australian architect Glenn Murcutt in May 2007

Overseas Campus

Dubai

 The University of Wollongong in Dubai (commonly referred to as the University of Wollongong Dubai Campus), abbreviated as UOWD, was established by the University of Wollongong in Australia in 1993 and is located in Knowledge Village KV 14 and 15 Dubai, United Arab Emirates. The university is one of the United Arab Emirates' oldest universities. The campus employs over 4,000 staff and has a student cohort of over 4,000 from almost one hundred countries. While affiliated to the University of Wollongong, UW Dubai remains a separate and autonomous institution.

Organisation

The University of Wollongong has four faculties.

Faculty of the Arts, Social Sciences & Humanities
 School of the Arts, English and Media
School of Education
 School of Geography and Sustainable Communities
 School of Health and Society
School of Humanities and Social inquiry
School of Liberal Arts
 School of Psychology
 Early Start Research

Faculty of Business and Law
 School of Accounting, Economics & Finance
 School of Management, Operations & Marketing
School of Law
 Sydney Business School, University of Wollongong
 Australian Health Services Research Institute
Australian National Centre for Ocean Resources & Security 

Faculty of Engineering and Information Sciences
 School of Civil, Mining & Environmental Engineering
 School of Physics
 School of Mechanical, Materials, Mechatronic and Biomedical Engineering
 School of Computing and Information Technology
 School of Electrical, Computer and Telecommunications Engineering
 School of Mathematics & Applied Statistics
 SMART Infrastructure Facility
 Australian Steel Research Hub
 Sustainable Buildings Research Centre

Faculty of Science, Medicine and Health
 School of Biological Sciences
 School of Chemistry
 School of Earth & Environmental Sciences
 School of Medicine
 School of Nursing
 Illawarra Health and Medical Research Institute

Library 
The University of Wollongong has multiple libraries across its campuses.

Academics

Awards, rankings and recognition

The University of Wollongong is ranked among the best 20 modern universities in the world in the QS Top 50 Under 50 Rankings 2019. It is ranked 171-180th in the world by the 2020 QS Graduate Employability Ranking for the quality of its graduates.

Ranked 42nd in Times Higher Education Asia-Pacific University Rankings 2019.

Ranked among the top 200 universities in the world - QS World University Rankings 2021

Ranked 185th in the world and 10th in Australia - QS World University Rankings 2023

The Quality Indicators for Learning and Teaching (QILT) has ranked UOW as the number 1 university in Australia for the quality of its graduates.

Historic recognition 

 Excellence in Research for Australia University Rankings 2018 – UOW is ranked 10th in Australia by the Australian Research Council.

Student life

Facilities
The Wollongong Undergraduate Students' Association produces the magazine Tertangala, and many other services including representation, advocacy and student support. Postgraduate representation is provided by the Wollongong University Postgraduate Association, a member of the Council of Australian Postgraduate Associations.

Wollongong UniCentre, an on-campus organisation and controlled entity of the university, provides the social and commercial infrastructure on the campus, administering the UniBar, student clubs and societies, food outlets, entertainment and activities, a books and news shop and other student services.

The geographical and social centre of the university is the Duck Pond Lawn, and its surrounding eateries and other facilities, including the UniBar. The UniBar serves alcoholic drinks and a small range of lunch foods. The UniBar building was opened by Colin Markham MP, Simon Zulian Student Rep, Nigel Pennington UniCentre GM and Gerard Sutton VC on 14 May 2001. The UniBar has since won numerous awards including the Major Award and the Public Building Award of the Architectural Design Awards held in Wollongong in 2003, the "ACUMA" award for Best New Campus Facility and the Master Builders Award for Excellence in Construction by Camarda and Cantril.

In line with Commonwealth legislation introduced in October 2011, the University of Wollongong instated the Student Services and Amenities Fee. This fee was charged to student depending on their study load and location, and has been used to upgrade and subsidise existing facilities and install new facilities such as common barbecue areas.

Sports

Soccer
The University of Wollongong announced a partnership with Premier League club Tottenham Hotspur in 2018. The partnership will see FA and UEFA-qualified Tottenham Hotspur coaches train participating students for 36 weeks a year at the university's Wollongong campus. As part of the UOW Tottenham Hotspur Global Football Program, students also have the opportunity to attend the Player Development Program at the state-of-the-art Tottenham Hotspur Training Centre in London.

Rugby
The Wollongong University RC (or UOW Mallee Bulls) competes in the Illawarra Rugby Union premiership. The club plays their home games at the University Oval, Wollongong. The Mallee Bulls wear red, white and blue jerseys. The club fields three senior teams and a women's side.

The University of Wollongong Titans (or UOW Titans) is a former rugby league football team that was part of Country Rugby League and competed in the Illawarra Rugby League premiership.

Residential colleges
The university has a number of residential college and halls of residence:

Bangalay
 Campus East
Graduate House
 I-House
 Kooloobong Village

I-House is the oldest residential college of the University of Wollongong and is an affiliate of the 16 International Houses Worldwide. It provides accommodation to approximately 218 students who are attending the University of Wollongong. It is situated at the corner of Porter and Hindmarsh Avenue in North Wollongong, near the North Wollongong railway station.

Residents of the residential college are predominantly undergraduate students, with some postgraduate students also accommodated. International House provides catered, dormitory style accommodation. There are 218 beds, 14 shared rooms (28 beds) and 190 single rooms.

Safe and Respectful Community

The University of Wollongong is committed to creating a safe and respectful environment for all members of our community. We believe everyone has the right to feel safe and supported on campus, free from violence, abuse and harassment.

Cooperation

Affiliations
The University of Wollongong has affiliated to a number of associations and organisations:
 The Member of the Association to Advance Collegiate Schools of Business (AACSB)
 The Member of the Association of Commonwealth Universities (ACU)
 The Member of the Australian European Network (AEN), related to the Utrecht Network
 The Member of the Association of Southeast Asian Institutions of Higher Learning (ASAIHL)
 The Prominent Member of the Apple University Consortium (AUC)
 The Member of the International Association of Universities (IAU)
 The Member of Universities Australia
 The Associate Member of the Group of Eight Deans of Engineering and Associates
 The Member of the University Global Partnership Network
 The Member of the NUW (Newcastle, UNSW, Wollongong) Alliance
 Jubilee Oval in Kogarah, New South Wales, is commercially known as "UOW Jubilee Oval".

Research
The university's Innovation Campus is home to the  Centre, an innovation accelerator housing over 280 start-up entrepreneurs.

Major research entities 
 The Australian Institute of Innovative Materials (AIIM)
 Early Start Research Institute (ESRI)
 Smart Infrastructure Research Facility (SMART)
 The Sustainable Buildings Research Centre (SBRC)
 Illawarra Health and Medical Research Institute (IHMRI), an independent health and medical research institute based on the University of Wollongong campus. IHMRI is a joint initiative of the University of Wollongong and the Illawarra Shoalhaven Local Health District. It was initiated to improve the health and wellbeing of Illawarra residents by developing a regional centre of excellence in health and medical research. The building was dedicated to former Vice Chancellor, Emeritus Professor Gerard Sutton representing his significant contribution from 1995 to 2011 at the university.
 Australian Health Services Research Institute (AHSRI)

Research entities 
 Advanced Manufacturing Technologies
 Australian Centre for Cultural Environmental Research (AUSSCER)
 Australian National Centre for Ocean Resources and Security (ANCORS)
 Centre for Archaeological Science (CAS)
 Centre for Medical & Molecular Bioscience (CMMB)
 Centre for Medical Radiation Physics (CMRP)
 Early Start Research Institute (ESRI)
 Engineering Materials (EM)
 GeoQuEST Research Centre
 National Institute for Applied Statistical Research Australia (NIASRA)

International research
The University of Wollongong has formed key alliances with a number of international corporations and organisations:

 Co-operation between the Geological Survey Organisation of Indonesia and the GeoQuEST Research Strength.
 Members of the Institute for Social Transformation Research participating in numerous international networks dedicated to understanding the causes and implications of social change and cultural transformation. Current collaborative projects engage with research centres in Japan, Sweden, Malaysia, the UK and elsewhere.
 Research partnerships between CAPSTRANS and a range of research groups in the Asia Pacific.
 The Intelligent Polymer Research Institute (IPRI) has developed global linkages with research institutions in the US, Japan, South Korea, China, Ireland, France, New Zealand, Singapore, Thailand and the United Kingdom working on multifunctional, stimuli-responsive materials for various applications.
 The Smart Foods and Public Health Centre is collaborating with research groups in Finland, Sweden, the US and Spain.

International exchanges
The University of Wollongong has 180 global partners, offering international short course and study abroad programs, and internships.

Exchange destinations

Asia-Pacific
 Hong Kong, Indonesia, Japan, Malaysia, Singapore, South Korea, Thailand, China & New Caledonia

Europe
 Denmark, Finland, France, Germany, Ireland, Italy, Macedonia, The Netherlands, Norway, Spain, Sweden, Switzerland, Turkey & the United Kingdom

Americas
 Brazil, Canada, Mexico & the United States of America

Utrecht Network
 Austria, Belgium, Czech Republic, Denmark, Estonia, Finland, France, Germany, Greece, Hungary, Iceland, Ireland, Italy, Latvia, Lithuania, Malta, the Netherlands, Norway, Poland, Portugal, Romania, Slovakia, Slovenia, Spain, Sweden, Switzerland & the United Kingdom

Dubai Study Program
 University of Wollongong in Dubai

Alumni and staff

UOW is consistently ranked in the top 1% of universities in the world for the quality of its graduates, including in the 2022 QS Graduate Employability Rankings

As of 2022 the QS World University Rankings placed Wollongong at the 146th  in the world for graduate employability.

As of 2023, the university has turned out more than 176,000 graduates, and also has alumni members all over the world in 199 countries. Although a large number of alumni live in Wollongong and Sydney, and a significant number also live in Melbourne, Brisbane, Canberra, Singapore, Kuala Lumpur, Hong Kong, Bangkok, London, New York and Washington, D.C.

See also
List of universities in Australia

 University of Wollongong in Dubai
 List of University of Wollongong people

References

Further reading

External links

 
 UOW Photographs
 University ephemera and memorabilia
 University Recordings

 
Universities in New South Wales
Educational institutions established in 1951
Buildings and structures in Wollongong
1951 establishments in Australia